Monographella nivalis var. nivalis is a plant pathogen that causes, for instance, fusarium patch in grasses.

External links 
 Index Fungorum
 USDA ARS Fungal Database

References 

Xylariales
Fungal plant pathogens and diseases
Fungi described in 1977